The Prix de la critique is a prize awarded by the Association des Critiques et des journalistes de Bande Dessinée to the best comic album released for a year in France. Previously, from 1984 to 2003, it was called Prix Bloody Mary and awarded at the Angoulême International Comics Festival. Concerned at first with albums of the Franco-Belgian comics school it was eventually interested in works coming from the comic book tradition of more distant lands.

The winner of the award for that year is listed first, the others listed below are the nominees.

1980s

 1984:  by Jean Teulé and Jean Vautrin, Glénat
 1985: Les Pionniers de l'aventure humaine by François Boucq, Casterman
 1986: Le Bal de la Sueur by Cromwell,  and Ralph, EDS

1990s

 1991: Les Lumières de l'Amalou 1: Théo by Claire Wendling, Delcourt
 1992: La bretelle ne passera pas ! by Jean-Luc Abiven, Rackham
 1995: L'argent roi collective led by Thierry Groensteen, Autrement
 1996: L'Histoire du conteur électrique by Fred, Dargaud

2000s

 2000: Understanding Comics: The Invisible Art (L'Art Invisible) by Scott McCloud, Vertige Graphic
 2001: From Hell by Alan Moore and Eddie Campbell, Delcourt
 Déogratias by Jean-Philippe Stassen, Dupuis
 Gemma Bovary by Posy Simmonds, Denoël Graphic
 Pleine Lune by Christophe Chabouté, Vents d'Ouest
 2002: Stuck Rubber Baby (Un monde de différence) by Howard Cruse, Vertige Graphic
 : Les canons de 18 mars by Jacques Tardi and Jean Vautrin, Casterman
 Hicksville by Dylan Horrocks, L'Association
  by Étienne Davodeau, Delcourt
 2003: Jimmy Corrigan by Chris Ware, Delcourt
 Le chat du rabbin part 1 and 2 by Joann Sfar, Dargaud
 Quartier lointain part 1 by Jirô Taniguchi, Casterman
 2004: La Grippe coloniale 1: le retour d'Ulysse by Serge Huo-Chao-Si and Appollo, Vents d'Ouest
 Special 20th Anniversary Award:  by Jean-Philippe Stassen and Denis Lapière, Dupuis
 2005: Blankets (Manteau de neige) by Craig Thompson, Casterman
 2006:  by Étienne Davodeau, Delcourt
 2008: Seules contre tous by Miriam Katin, Le Seuil
 2009: Tamara Drewe by Posy Simmonds, Denoël Graphic

2010s

 2011: Asterios Polyp by David Mazzucchelli, Casterman
 2012:  by Bastien Vivès, KSTЯ
 2014:  by Chloé Cruchaudet, Delcourt
 2018:  by Gipi, Futuropolis
 2019: My Favorite Thing Is Monsters by Emil Ferris, Fantagraphics

2020s
2020: Préférence système by 
2021:  by Hubert Boulard and

Sources
 Official website , last accessed 19 March 2009

References

Comics awards
Angoulême International Comics Festival